Events from the year 1918 in Ireland.

Events
18 January – Count Plunkett, Seán T. O'Kelly and others protest at the forcible feeding of Sinn Féin prisoners in Mountjoy Prison.
5 February –  is torpedoed off the Irish coast; it is the first ship carrying United States troops to Europe to be torpedoed and sunk.
2 March – In Skibbereen, County Cork, Ernest Blythe is arrested for non-compliance with a military rule directing him to reside in Ulster.
6 March – in the British House of Commons, tributes are paid to John Redmond, Irish Nationalist leader, who has died in London.
18 April – the Military Service Bill, which includes conscription in Ireland, becomes law. A conference of nationalist parties, Sinn Féin and labour movements meets in Dublin to organise an all-Ireland opposition to conscription.
20 April – the Irish Parliamentary Party holds a meeting in Dublin to oppose conscription.
23 April – General Strike in opposition to conscription.
May – RAF Aldergrove opens.
5 May – 15,000 people attend an anti-conscription meeting in County Roscommon. John Dillon, leader of the Irish Parliamentary Party and Éamon de Valera of Sinn Féin share the platform in a united cause.
9 May – Field Marshal Sir John French, Viscount French of Ypres and of High Lake in the County of Roscommon, is appointed Lord Lieutenant of Ireland and Supreme Commander of the British Army in Ireland.

20 May – a special anti-conscription convention is held in Dublin. It condemns the arrest and deportation of Sinn Féin members consequent to the "German Plot".
20 June – Arthur Griffith of Sinn Féin wins a by-election in East Cavan. It is Sinn Féin's first victory of the year after three successive by-election defeats. 
3 July – the Lord Lieutenant issues a proclamation banning Sinn Féin, the Irish Volunteers, the Gaelic League and Cumann na mBan.
17 July –  is torpedoed and sunk off the east coast of Ireland by Imperial German Navy U-boat ; 218 of the 223 on board are rescued.
10 October – the Irish mail boat  is sunk in the Irish Sea by Imperial German Navy U-boat  with the loss of over 500 lives.
11 November – at 5.00am an armistice dictated by the Allies is signed by the Germans. Six hours later World War I officially ends. Well over 206,000 Irishmen have served and over 35,000 been killed during the war; there is no Irish parish without a loss.
22 December – Ireland voices a united invitation to President of the United States Woodrow Wilson to visit.
28 December – Sinn Féin have a landslide victory in the general election, winning 73 of the 105 seats in Ireland. The Irish Parliamentary Party is nearly wiped out. In accordance with their manifesto, Sinn Féin members will not take their seats in the House of Commons of the United Kingdom but will form the First Dáil. Countess Constance Markievicz, while detained in Holloway Prison, becomes the first woman elected to (but does not take her seat in) the Palace of Westminster. On 30 December the Irish Independent strongly criticises her.

Arts and literature
 March – the Telemachus episode of James Joyce's Ulysses is published (in serialised form) in the American journal The Little Review.
 25 May – James Joyce's Exiles: a play in three acts is published in London.
 August – Anglo-Welsh composer Philip Heseltine concludes a year's stay in Ireland with the writing of a number of songs which will be published under the pseudonym Peter Warlock.
 Francis Ledwidge's poems Last Songs are published posthumously, edited by Lord Dunsany.
 Toirdhealbhach Mac Suibhne (Terence MacSwiney)'s poems Battle-cries are published in Cork.
 'Brinsley MacNamara' (John Weldon writing as 'Oliver Blyth') publishes his novel The Valley of the Squinting Windows.

Sport

Gaelic Athletic Association (GAA)
All Ireland Senior Hurling Final
Limerick 9–5 d Wexford 1–3
All Ireland Senior Football Final
Wexford 0–5 d Tipperary 0–4

Football
Irish League
Winners: Linfield
Irish Cup
Winners: Belfast Celtic 0–0, 0–0, 2–0 Linfield

Births
January – John Coffey, Tipperary hurler (died 2019).
18 January – Jim Langton, Kilkenny hurler (died 1987).
23 January – Charlie Kerins, Chief of Staff of the IRA, convicted of murder of Garda Síochána officer (hanged 1944).
26 January – Louis Jacobson, cricketer (died 2013).
7 February – Markey Robinson, artist (died 1999).
14 February
Thomas J. Fitzpatrick, Ceann Comhairle and Fine Gael TD and Cabinet Minister (died 2006).
Valentin Iremonger, poet and diplomat (died 1991).
3 March – Peter O'Sullevan, horseracing commentator (died 2015 in England).
5 March – Denis J. O'Sullivan, Fine Gael TD (died 1987).
17 March – Frederick Blaney, cricketer (died 1988).
12 March – Pádraig Faulkner, Fianna Fáil TD for Louth and Cabinet Minister (died 2012).
16 April – Spike Milligan, comedian, poet and writer (born in the British Raj; died 2002 in England).
22 May – Alan Clodd, book collector, dealer and publisher (died 2002).
23 June – James Young, comedian (died 1974).
27 June – Marie Kean, actress (died 1993).
7 August – Florrie Burke, soccer player (died 1995).
9 August – Luke Belton, Fine Gael TD (died 2006).
29 August – John Herivel, historian of science and cryptanalyst (died 2011).
12 September – Valerie Goulding, Senator and campaigner for the disabled (died 2003).
17 September – Chaim Herzog, Belfast-born sixth President of Israel (1983–1993) (died 1997).
22 September – A. J. Potter, composer (died 1980).
26 September – Jackie Vernon, footballer (died 1981).
29 September – Douglas Gageby, journalist and newspaper editor (died 2004).
13 October – Jack MacGowran, actor (died 1973).
October – Hugh McLaughlin, publisher and inventor (died 2006).
19 November – Brendan Corish, Labour Party leader, TD, Cabinet Minister and Tánaiste (died 1990).
24 December – Willie Clancy, uileann piper (died 1973).
Full date unknown – Terry Leahy, Kilkenny hurler (died 1988).

Deaths
6 January – Dora Sigerson Shorter, poet and sculptor (born 1866; died in London).
23 January – Robert Gregory, cricketer and artist (born 1881).
1 February – William Melville, police officer and first chief of the British Secret Service (born 1850).
13 February – Henry Arthur Blake, British colonial administrator and Governor of Hong Kong (born 1840).
27 March – Martin Sheridan, Olympic gold medallist for the United States (born 1881).
28 March – Arthur Bateman, cricketer (born 1890).
8 April – David Nelson, soldier, recipient of the Victoria Cross for gallantry in 1914 at Néry, France (born 1886).
18 April – Samuel Young, 96-year-old MP for East Cavan
7 May – James Somers, soldier, recipient of the Victoria Cross for gallantry in 1915 at Gallipoli, Turkey (born 1884).
10 June – William Parsons, 5th Earl of Rosse, soldier (born 1873).
19 July – William McDonnell, 6th Earl of Antrim, peer (born 1851).
26 July – Edward Mannock, First World War flying ace and posthumous recipient of the Victoria Cross (born 1887).
31 July – George McElroy, Royal Flying Corps and Royal Air Force pilot during World War I, killed in action (born 1893).
18 September – Claude Joseph Patrick Nunney, recipient of the Victoria Cross for gallantry in 1918 on the Drocourt-Queant Line, France (born 1892).
25 September – John Ireland, third bishop and first Archbishop of Saint Paul, Minnesota (born 1838).
1 October – Martin Joseph Sheehan, soldier and Royal Air Service Observer in World War I, killed in action (born 1896).
14 October – Louis Lipsett, British Army and Canadian Expeditionary Force senior officer during the First World War, killed in action (born 1874).
14 November – Seumas O'Kelly, journalist and author (born 1881)

References

 
1910s in Ireland
Ireland
Years of the 20th century in Ireland
Ireland